"Entre Nosotras" was a variety morning show aired on WAPA-TV from 2007 to 2016. It was hosted by an ensemble of Puerto Rican actresses: Alba Nydia Díaz, Sonia Valentin, Linette Torres and Wanda Sais. Their daily show covers news stories of interest to the general public, from a female point of view.

Show history
Initially "Entre Nosotras" was hosted by Maria del Carmen Gonzalez, and Gladys Rodriguez. Maricarmen Avilés joined the group after being encouraged to do so by Díaz, Valentín and  Noris Joffre.

The show's biggest rival is "Despierta America" on Univision.

See also
 WAPA-TV
 WAPA America

References

External links
 "Entre Nosotras" Official Site
 WAPA-TV Official Site

2000s American variety television series
Puerto Rican television series
2007 Puerto Rican television series debuts
2000s Puerto Rican television series